The Orthodox Ohrid Archbishopric (OOA; Serbian and , Pravoslavna ohridska arhiepiskopija (POA)) is an autonomous Eastern Orthodox archbishopric of the Serbian Orthodox Church with jurisdiction over the territory of North Macedonia. 

The Orthodox Ohrid Archbishopric has been refused registration by the State Religion Commission of North Macedonia on the grounds that one group may be registered for each confession and that the name was not sufficiently distinct from that of the Macedonian Orthodox Church (MOC).

The Archbishopric claims inheritance from the Ohrid Archbishopric of Justiniana prima and all Bulgaria, established in 1019 by Byzantine Emperor Basil II by lowering the status of the autocephalous Bulgarian Patriarchate and abolished in 1767 by the Ottomans. The Bulgarian Orthodox Church also claims inheritance from the Ohrid Archbishopric of Justiniana prima and all Bulgaria. Numerous international organizations have criticized the authorities of North Macedonia for their moves towards the Orthodox Ohrid Archbishopric and Archbishop Jovan VI, raising the possibility of a threat to religious freedoms.

Creation

In attempt to restore its canonical status and gain recognition from the Eastern Orthodox churches, the Macedonian Orthodox Church negotiated with the Serbian Orthodox Church, and these negotiations led to an eventual agreement signed in Niš in June 2002, thus known as the Niš Agreement. The agreement was signed by all bishops of both delegations. However, the bishops of the delegations of the Macedonian Orthodox Church were exposed to severe criticism for signing this agreement, and although they attempted to defend it for a short time, the Synod of the MOC rejected the agreement.

The Serbian Patriarch Pavle then summoned all bishops, clergy, monastics and faithful people to enter in liturgical and canonical unity with the Serbian Orthodox Church. Jovan Vraniškovski, Metropolitan of Veles and Povardarie, and all priests of Veles agreed to respond to this call, and all signed a document of agreement.

On 23 September 2002, Metr. Jovan was appointed Exarch of all the territories of the Ohrid Archdiocese by the Assembly of the Serbian Orthodox Church. On 25 December 2003, he was elected Chairman of the Holy Synod of Bishops of the Orthodox Ohrid Archbishopric, after it had been constituted.

On 24 May 2005, he was confirmed by Serbian Patriarch as Archbishop of Ohrid and Metropolitan of Skopje in accordance with the Niš Agreement. On the same day, there was an announcement of the Patriarchal and the Assembly's tomos for autonomy of the Ohrid Archbishopric, with Archbishop Jovan as the Chairman of the Holy Synod of Bishops.

Persecution
Upon entering in the canonical and ecclesiastical unity with the Serbian Orthodox Church, and through that with the whole community of Orthodox Churches, Archbishop Jovan was expelled by the police, without a court order, from his residence and cathedra in Veles on 7 July 2002. In the same manner, illegally and without a court order, the monks of four monasteries, were expelled from their monasteries, i.e. homes, in January 2004, immediately after joining the Orthodox Ohrid Archbishopric. A fifth monastery, Saint John Chrysostom in the village Nižepole near Bitola, was broken into by armed and masked men, who not finding the Archbishop Jovan they were after, harassed and threatened the nuns with machine-guns, cut their hair and set the monastery on fire, in February 2004.

Orthodox Ohrid Archbishopric buildings were raided by the police. The Church in the Saint John Chrysostom monastery was demolished by the state authorities on 15 October 2004. The chapel St. Nectarios of Aegina, after being broken into and vandalized on several occasions, was at the end completely demolished on 12 July 2005. The priest who served at that chapel, Fr. Borjan Vitanov, was beaten up twice. Additional complaints of harassment have been reported.

Archbishop Jovan was sentenced to 18 months of prison in June 2005 for "[i]nstigation of ethnic, racial and religious hatred, discord and intolerance". The verdict stated the conviction relied on these three points: 
 he wrote a text in a religious calendar in which he slanders the Macedonian Orthodox Church
 he agreed to be appointed as an Exarch of the Ohrid Archbishopric in Macedonia and participated in the ordination of the bishops Joakim (Jovčevski) and Marko (Kimev) and
 he officiated at a religious service in an apartment owned by his parents.

He served 220 days in prison before the Supreme court declared the last two of the three points to be unconstitutional and his sentence was shortened to 8 months. Archbishop Jovan was sentenced for the second time, on charges for Embezzlement, and as a second defendant was sentenced to a higher prison term of 2 years than the first defendant (who was sentenced 1 year and 3 months) in 2006. He served 256 days before being released.

The declaratively secular state legalized its identification with a specific religious community Macedonian Orthodox Church, through the Parliament’s "Declaration for support of the autocephaly of the MOC" reached on 23 January 2004. The Orthodox Ohrid Archbishopric is denied registration by the state authorities.

International reactions
 The United States Department of State includes in its "Religious Freedom Report" and "Human Rights Report" information regarding the "restrictions of the religious freedoms of the members of the Orthodox Ohrid Archbishopric, existence of religious prisoners, violation of freedom of movement, police terror and demolition of a monastery, prevention of OSCE from obtaining a copy of the decision upon which the demolition was carried out, police interrogations of the members of the Orthodox Ohrid Archbishopric etc."
 The US Mission to the OSCE warned of "Violation of freedom of religion and encouraged the authorities to apply the law fairly, advising the government should avoid involving in religious disputes, reminding that Article Nine of the European Convention on Human Rights and Article 19 of the Macedonian Constitution as well as Macedonia’s OSCE commitments, and international norms, all guarantee his right to freedom of religion".
 The European Commission pointed out that "cases of violations of religious freedom exist and emphasized that the new law should provide more liberal procedure for registering religious communities".
 The European Court of Human Rights ruled that the refusal of the government to register the Orthodox Ohrid Archbishopric constitutes a violation of the European Convention on Human Rights.
 Amnesty International declared the Archbishop Jovan a Prisoner of conscience.
 Freedom House reported that Archbishop Jovan has been "arrested [...] for his ties to the Serbian Orthodox Church. In Freedom House's publications "Macedonia received a downward trend arrow due to [...] an increase in the harassment of leaders of various religious groups".
 The Helsinki Committee for Human Rights constantly reports about the violation of the religious freedoms and human rights of the members of the Orthodox Ohrid Archbishopric: "The violation of several basic rights was the result of activities of a number of state institutions (especially the Ministry of the Interior) directed against not only the followers (monks of the MOC who were supporting Vraniskovski), but also against citizens who approve of him or had compassionate sentiments or attitude towards them. This can be illustrated by the following: problems upon entry and exit from the state, threats, police detention, lawsuits against citizens who have provided housing for the outcast monks, police ban in the exercise of the right to residence".
 Commission on Security and Cooperation in Europe reported about the imprisonment of Archbishop Jovan, finding that "Macedonian officials, in response to the ecclesiastical dispute concerning the status of the Macedonian Orthodox Church, have over-reacted and that the 18-month prison term sentence is excessive and unjustified". Regarding the case of the destruction of the chapel, the report states that "The government, at least, must exhibit more restraint and end these harassments, and also pay reparations for the destroyed buildings. The report also covers the religious freedom governing legal framework, finding it ambiguous, and further stating that Since religious groups are required to register, the lack of a clear mechanism can be problematic." 
 Forum 18 reports that New Religion Law perpetuates discrimination
 Ecumenical Patriarch Bartholomew I of Constantinople sent a letter to the Prime Minister of Macedonia requesting immediate release of Archbishop Jovan.
 Patriarch Alexy II of Moscow sent a letter to the President of Macedonia demanding immediate release of the Archbishop Jovan.
 Holy Synod Of Hierarchs Of The Church of Greece expressed a severe protest for an emergent release of Archbishop Jovan from prison, and for respect of religious freedom in Macedonia.
 The Holy Community of the Mount Athos sent a letter of support to the Archbishop Jovan, signed by all representatives and abbots who are in the common Assembly of the twenty Holy Monasteries of the Holy Mount Athos.
 The Standing Conference of the Canonical Orthodox Bishops in the Americas condemned the imprisonment of Archbishop Jovan by Macedonia and asked for his release.
 Metropolitan Herman of the Orthodox Church in America called for release of Archbishop Jovan of Ohrid.

Current status 
On May 15th, 2022 at the first session of the annual meeting of the Holy Council of Bishops of the Serbian Orthodox Church, an Encyclical on the Occasion of the Centennial Celebration of the Re-establishment of the Serbian Patriarchate was adopted and signed by all bishops of SOC, including all four bishops of OOA. At the second session, held on May 16, the Council decided to resolve various disputes with the Macedonian Orthodox Church, thus healing the long-standing schism. On May 19th, a historical concelebration was held in Belgrade, by bishops of MOC and SOC, including bishops of OOA. On that occasion, archbishop Jovan (head of OOA) held a speech, expressing the support of OOA to the restoration of ecclesiastical unity. 

On May 24th, during the visit of Serbian Patriarch Porphyry to Skopje, the decision of SOC to recognize autocephaly of MOC was announced, and concelebration was held by hierarchs of MOC and SOC, including hierarchs of OOC. On that occasion, Patriarch emphasized in his speech that the Holy Council of Bishops (SOC) had set a task for the Synod to resolve all remaining technical and organizational issues.

Some of the most important organizational issues were related to the future status of OOA, but no concrete decisions on possible organizational unification of OOA and MOC were announced. Due to those circumstances, OOA hierarchy did not attend the publication of the patriarchal tomos on the autocephaly of MOC, which was handed over in Belgrade, on June 5th. Since then, OOA hierarchy did not make any official statements regarding the key issues arising from the relation between the mentioned patriarchal tomos and the older conciliar tomos from 2005. 

On June 19th, patriarch's envoy  Jovan (Ćulibrk), Bishop of Pakrac and Slavonia, met in Skopje with hierarchs of OOA on the occasion of the fifteenth anniversary of episcopal service of Bishop David (Ninov) of Stobi, but in spite of that, OOA hierarchy did not participate in any event organized by MOC on the occasion of the visit of Serbian Patriarch to North Macedonia, which took place on June 20th and 21st.

The question of organizational integration of OOA and MOC remains unresolved, and further decisions of are expected. Previously,  on June 10th, former Prime Minister of North Macedonia, Ljubčo Georgievski (in office from 1998 to 2002) stated in a televised interview that North Macedonia should apologize to archbishop Jovan (Vraniškovski) because of poor treatment during previous years. Similar issues regarding archbishop Jovan were raised by former Serbian Minister of Culture Vladan Vukosavljević (in office from 2016 to 2020) in his open letter to SOC hierarchy, dated June 22nd.

Structure 

As of 2005, the Orthodox Ohrid Archbishopric is headed by Archbishop Jovan VI of Ohrid. He presides over the Holy Synod of Hierarchs of the Orthodox Ohrid Archbishopric, consisting of the archbishop and 3 bishops.

Dioceses on the territory of North Macedonia:

 Metropolitanate of Skopje, an Archdiocese, headed by Archbishop Jovan VI of Ohrid;
  of Prespa and Pelagonia, vacant;
  of Bregalnica, headed by Bishop ;
 Eparchy of Debar and Kičevo, vacant;
 Eparchy of Polog and Kumanovo, headed by Bishop ;
  of Veles and Povardarie (Vardar), vacant;
  of Strumica, headed by locum tenens David;

The Holy Synod of bishops was constituted on 23 December 2003 in the monastery of Saint John Chrysostom. The current members of the Synod are:

 Archbishop Jovan (Vranišovski) of Ohrid and Metropolitan of Skopje; locum tenens of Veles and Povardarie.
 Bishop  of Polog and Kumanovo; locum tenens of Debar and Kičevo.
 Bishop  of Bregalnica;  locum tenens of Prespa and Pelagonia.
 Vicar bishop David (Ninov) of Stobi; locum tenens of Strumica.

See also
Archbishopric of Ohrid
Archbishop of Ohrid
List of Eparchies of the Serbian Orthodox Church

References

Literature

Further reading 
 SOC (2004): Statement of the Orthodox Archbishopric of Ochrid
 Forum 18
 Institute for War and Peace Reporting
 FreeArchbishop.com
 Ecumenical Patriarchate
 Patriarchia.ru
 Church of Greece
 The Orthodox Word

External links
 Orthodox Ohrid Archbishopric official page

Eastern Orthodoxy in North Macedonia
Ohrid
Organizations based in Skopje
Christian organizations established in 2002
Eastern Orthodox organizations established in the 21st century
Dioceses established in the 21st century
2002 establishments in the Republic of Macedonia
North Macedonia–Serbia relations
Persecution of Eastern Orthodox Christians